Neolucia is a genus of butterflies in the family Lycaenidae. The three species of this genus are endemic to Australia and Tasmania.

Species
The following species are recognised:

Neolucia agricola (Westwood, [1851])
Neolucia mathewi (Miskin, 1890)
Neolucia hobartensis (Miskin, 1890)

References

Polyommatini
Lycaenidae genera